Evelyn Arys (born 21 July 1990) is a Belgian former racing cyclist, who rode professionally in 2009, and from 2012 to 2016. She won the Belgian National Road Race Championships in 2011.

Major results

2008
 2nd  Team pursuit, UEC European Junior Track Championships
 4th Road race, UCI Junior World Championships
 UEC European Junior Road Championships
8th Time trial
9th Road race
2010
 3rd Road race, National Road Championships
2011
 1st  Road race, National Road Championships
2012
 1st  Road race, UEC European Under-23 Road Championships
 1st Stage 2 (TTT) Trophée d'Or Féminin
 7th Erondegemse Pijl
 9th Halle-Buizingen
 10th GP Stad Roeselare
2013
 9th Classica Citta di Padova
2015
 5th Diamond Tour

See also
 2009 Lotto-Belisol Ladiesteam season

References

External links

1990 births
Living people
Belgian female cyclists
Sportspeople from Aalst, Belgium
Cyclists from East Flanders
21st-century Belgian women